The 1907 British Columbia general election was the eleventh general election for the Province of British Columbia, Canada. It was held to elect members of the Legislative Assembly of British Columbia. The election called on December 24, 1906, and held on February 2, 1907.  The new legislature met for the first time on March 7, 1907.

The governing Conservative party won a second term in government, with almost half the popular vote, and a majority of the seats in the legislature, increasing its number of seats by 4 to 26.

The Liberal Party lost 4 seats in the legislature, despite winning about the same share of the popular vote that it had in the 1903 election.

The Socialist Party won one additional seat to bring its total to three.

Results

Notes:

* Party did not nominate candidates in the previous election.

1 One Conservative candidate, R. McBride, who contested and was elected in both Dewdney and Victoria City, is counted twice.

2 Organized in 1906. Not the same as the Canadian Labour Party of B.C. which contested the 1924 election. Sometimes referred to as "Independent Labour Party" by the newspapers which creates some confusion with the situation in Nanaimo City and Newcastle.

3 Although the candidates in Nanaimo City and Newcastle called themselves "Independent Labour" candidates, the Conservative press described them as "Liberal-Labour" candidates. They did have Liberal support in both cases and no Liberals were nominated for either District. They were also repudiated by the Victoria branch of the Canadian Labour Party of BC.

Results by riding

|-
||    
|align="center"  |Henry Esson Young
|align="center"  |AtlinConservative
||    
||    
|align="center"  |AlberniLiberal
|align="center"|Harlan Carey Brewster
||    
|-
||    
|align="center"|Robert Grant
|align="center"  |ComoxConservative
||    
||    
|align="center"  |CaribooLiberal
|align="center"|Harry Jones
||    
|-
||    
|align="center"|Richard McBride 1Premier
|align="center"  |DewdneyConservative
||    
||    
|align="center"  |CaribooLiberal
|align="center"|John MacKay Yorston
||    
|-
||    
|align="center"|Henry George Parson
|align="center"  |ColumbiaConservative
||    
||    
|align="center"  |ChilliwhackLiberal
|align="center"|Charles William Munro
||    
|-
||    
|align="center"|William Henry Hayward
|align="center"  |CowichanConservative
||    
||    
|align="center"  |EsquimaltLiberal
|align="center"|John Jardine
||    
|-
||    
|align="center"|William Roderick Ross
|align="center"  |FernieConservative
||    
||    
|align="center"  |LillooetLiberal
|align="center"|Mark Robert Eagleson
||    
|-
||    
|align="center"|Albert Edward McPhillips
|align="center"  |The IslandsConservative
||    
||    
|align="center"  |Nelson CityLiberal
|align="center"|George Arthur Benjamin Hall
||    
|-
||    
|align="center"|Frederick John Fulton
|align="center"  |KamloopsConservative
||    
||    
|align="center"  |CranbrookLiberal
|align="center"|James Horace King
||    
|-
||    
|align="center"|Neil Franklin MacKay
|align="center"  |KasloConservative
||    
||    
|align="center"  |DeltaLiberal
|align="center"|John Oliver
||    
|-
||    
|align="center"|Thomas Gifford
|align="center"  |New Westminster CityConservative
||    
||    
|align="center"  |GreenwoodLiberal
|align="center"|George Ratcliffe Naden
||    
|-
||    
|align="center"|Price Ellison
|align="center"  |OkanaganConservative
||    
||    
|align="center"  |The IslandsLiberal
|align="center"|Thomas Wilson Paterson
||    
|-
||    
|align="center"|Thomas Taylor
|align="center"  |RevelstokeConservative
||    
||    
|align="center"  |SkeenaLiberal
|align="center"|William Thomas Kergin
||    
|-
||    
|align="center"|Francis Lovett Carter-Cotton
|align="center"  |RichmondConservative
||    
||    
|align="center"  |YaleLiberal
|align="center"|Stuart Alexander Henderson
||    
|-
||    
|align="center"|David McEwen Eberts
|align="center"  |SaanichConservative
||    
||    
|align="center"  |Grand ForksSocialist
|align="center"|John McInnis
||    
|-
||    
|align="center"|Lytton Wilmot Shatford
|align="center"  |SimilkameenConservative
||    
||    
|align="center"  |Nanaimo CitySocialist
|align="center"|James Hurst Hawthornthwaite
||    
|-
||    
|align="center"|William Hunter
|align="center"  |SlocanConservative
||    
||    
|align="center"  |NewcastleSocialist
|align="center"|Parker Williams
||    
|-
||    
|align="center"|Charles William John Bowser
|align="center" rowspan=5 |Vancouver CityConservative
||    
|-
|-
||    
|align="center"|James Ford Garden
||    
|-
|-
||    
|align="center"|Alexander Henry Boswell MacGowan
||    
|-
||    
|align="center"|George Albert McGuire
||    
|-
|-
||    
|align="center"|Robert Garnett Tatlow
||    
|-
|-
||    
|align="center"|Henry Frederick William Behnsen
|align="center" rowspan=4 |Victoria CityConservative
||    
|-
|-
||    
|align="center"|Frederick Davey
||    
|-
|-
||    
|align="center"|Richard McBride 1Premier
||    
|-
|-
||    
|align="center"|Henry Broughton Thomson
||    
|-
|-
||    
|align="center"|James Hargrave Schofield
|align="center"  |YmirConservative
||    
|-
|
|align-left"|1 Elected simultaneously in Dewdney and Victoria City.
|
|
|
|-
| align="center" colspan="10"|Source:' Elections BC
|-
|}

See also
List of British Columbia political parties
Richard McBride

Further reading and referencesIn the Sea of Sterile Mountains: The Chinese in British Columbia'', Joseph Morton, J.J. Douglas, Vancouver (1974).  Despite its title, a fairly thorough account of the politicians and electoral politics in early BC.
 

1907
1907 elections in Canada
1907 in British Columbia
February 1907 events